John M. Belk Arena is a 5,295-seat multi-purpose arena, located on the campus of Davidson College, in Davidson, North Carolina, United States.

It is named for Davidson alumnus and benefactor John M. Belk (1920–2007), class of 1943.

As the centerpiece of the Baker Sports Complex, it is home to the Davidson Wildcats men's and women's basketball teams, the Davidson Wildcats wrestling team, and the women's volleyball team.

The playing surface is named McKillop Court in honor of former men's basketball coach Bob McKillop, who has coached the most victories in the school's history.

Bob Dylan performed at the arena during his 2006 North American Tour on May 2, 2006.

See also
 List of NCAA Division I basketball arenas

References

External links
 Davidson College Athletics - Belk Arena
 Davidson College - John M. Belk Arena

Sports venues in Mecklenburg County, North Carolina
Basketball venues in North Carolina
College basketball venues in the United States
College volleyball venues in the United States
Davidson Wildcats basketball
Indoor arenas in North Carolina
1989 establishments in North Carolina
Sports venues completed in 1989